Croata may refer to:

 Croatá, a place in Brazil
 Croatina, a wine grape variety
 Croatia, a country in Europe
 Ivan Lacković Croata, Croatian naive painter